Only the Young were an English pop group consisting of Mikey Bromley, Betsy-Blue English, Charlie George and Parisa Tarjomani. They were created and managed by Jo Perry. The group previously featured George Shelley, who auditioned for ninth series of The X Factor as a soloist who was later added to Union J who made the live shows, eventually finishing in fourth place in the semi-final. This was when Shelley was later replaced by Bromley. In 2014, Only the Young entered the eleventh series of The X Factor and made the live shows, where they finished in seventh place.

On 6 November 2015, Tajormani announced her departure from the group via her blog. Only the Young then announced their disbandment later that month.

Career

Early career
Parisa Tarjomani and Charlie George had known each other since they were children, Only the Young cast Betsy-Blue English to the band and George Shelley in 2012. Shelley went on to audition for the ninth series of The X Factor UK that same year. He auditioned as a solo artist but was later added to Union J who made the live shows finishing in fourth place in the semi-final. After Shelley's departure, he was later replaced by Mikey Bromley. Before auditioning for The X Factor, Only the Young auditioned for Capital's Summertime Ball on 21 June 2014, and were chosen to perform at Wembley Stadium alongside Pharrell Williams, Miley Cyrus, David Guetta, Enrique Iglesias, Little Mix and many other artists.

2014: The X Factor
Only The Young auditioned for eleventh series of The X Factor. While on the series, Only the Young released their version of Bobby "Boris" Pickett's "Monster Mash" in aid of Teenage Cancer Trust. Only The Young made the live shows and were mentored by Louis Walsh. Additionally Walsh mentored Union J when Shelley was on the show in 2012. They were in the bottom two with Jake Quickenden in week three, but they were saved after receiving only Mel B's vote against them. They were automatically eliminated in week seven as the act with the fewest public votes on Saturday, coming in seventh place. Two weeks after being voted off the show, the group announced their first headlining show which would be held in London's Under the Bridge on 28 December 2014, thus becoming the first act of the series to be successful after leaving the show. However, the group had to pull out of the event following the death of Tarjomani's mother on 21 December.

2015: "I Do" and split
On 30 April 2015, they were guests at the 10th Young Scot Awards. On 19 May 2015, they announced that they had signed a deal with Warner Music, with their debut single to be released during summer 2015. The music video of their debut single "I Do" was released on 8 June 2015, but their YouTube account was hacked four days later, which led to its deletion. It was re-uploaded the next day (13 June), losing all its previous views. "I Do" was originally to be released on 31 July, but due to the migrant crisis in Calais preventing a lorry containing copies of their single coming into the UK, it had to be delayed by a week, instead being released on 7 August. "I Do" debuted at number 53 on the UK Singles Chart on 14 August, but was the most physically purchased song of the week. The single also hit Number 41 in the Irish Single Charts On 18 August, the band announced their first headlining UK tour, which started on 1 September.

On 6 November 2015, Tarjormani announced her departure from the band via her blog. Only The Young then announced their split in November 2015.

2017: First and final album
On 4 October 2017 the group released their self-titled debut album, featuring songs they originally planned to release, to please their fanbase.

Discography

References

External links 
 

English pop music groups
Musical groups established in 2012
Musical groups disestablished in 2015
The X Factor (British TV series) contestants
2012 establishments in England